Opisthotropis atra is a species of natricine snake.

References

Opisthotropis
Reptiles described in 1872
Taxa named by Albert Günther